Tarleton Gillespie is a Principal Researcher at Microsoft Research New England and an Adjunct Associate Professor in the Department of Communication at Cornell University. He is the author of the book Wired Shut: Copyright and the Shape of Digital Culture.

Education
Gillespie received his B.A. in English from Amherst College in 1994, and his M.A. in Communication from the University of California, San Diego in 1997.  He obtained his Ph.D. in Communication from the University of California, San Diego in January 2002. He has been working for the Department of Communication at Cornell University since 2010.

Research
Gillespie is currently researching the impact of the Internet and modern media technologies on copyright law and the progression of copyright law in the digital age. He is also interested in topics such as digital rights management and other digital copy protection strategies and their effect on culture. Broader interests include debates on peer-to-peer file-sharing, information technology, animation and children's media. His 2018 book Custodians of the Internet discusses the complex relationship social media sites have with hate speech and extremist groups on their sites, as there are no defined "custodian" responsibilities in policing this content, and actions taken are mainly left up to the discretion of private companies.

Publications
 Gillespie, Tarleton. Wired Shut: Copyright and the Shape of Digital Culture (MIT Press, 2007).
 Gillespie, Tarleton. Custodians of the Internet (Yale University Press, 2018).

References

External links
 Blog
 Department of Communication, Cornell University, Bio Page

1973 births
Cornell University faculty
Living people
Copyright scholars
Amherst College alumni
University of California, San Diego alumni